The rainbow whiptail (Cnemidophorus lemniscatus) is a species of lizard found in Central America, the Caribbean, and northern South America. It has also been introduced in Florida and has established populations there. A rainbow whiptail grows up to approximately 12 inches (30.5 cm).

Both sexually reproducing and parthenogenetic populations are known.

References

Cnemidophorus
Lizards of Central America
Lizards of South America
Lizards of the Caribbean
Reptiles of Belize
Reptiles of Brazil
Reptiles of Colombia
Reptiles of Costa Rica
Reptiles of El Salvador
Reptiles of French Guiana
Reptiles of Guatemala
Reptiles of Guyana
Reptiles of Honduras
Reptiles of Nicaragua
Reptiles of Panama
Reptiles of Suriname
Reptiles of Trinidad and Tobago
Reptiles of Venezuela
Reptiles described in 1758
Taxa named by Carl Linnaeus